Liam Robbins (born July 12, 1999) is an American college basketball player for the Vanderbilt Commodores of the Southeastern Conference (SEC). He previously played for the Drake Bulldogs and the Minnesota Golden Gophers.

High school career
Robbins played sparingly in his first three years at Assumption High School in Davenport, Iowa. He entered the starting lineup as a senior, averaging 9.2 points per game. Robbins had no NCAA Division I scholarship offers out of high school and reclassified to attend Sunrise Christian Academy in Bel Aire, Kansas. He weighed about 300 lbs (136 kg) when he arrived at Sunrise but reached a weight of 235 lbs (107 kg) after four months by fasting and working out. On April 17, 2018, he committed to play college basketball for Drake.

College career

Drake

As a freshman at Drake, Robbins served as a backup to Nick McGlynn, whom he took advice from. He averaged 4.1 points, 2.7 rebounds and 1.1 blocks per game. On January 7, 2020, Robbins recorded 20 points, nine rebounds and a career-high seven blocks in a 65–62 win over Loyola–Chicago, despite having the stomach flu. He tied the program single-game record for blocks. On February 5, Robbins posted a career-high 29 points, seven rebounds and three blocks in a 73–60 victory over Bradley. As a sophomore, he averaged 14.1 points, 7.1 rebounds and 2.9 blocks per game, which ranked fifth in the nation, while recording a school-record 99 blocks. He was named to the Second Team All-Missouri Valley Conference (MVC) and earned All-Defensive Team, Most Improved Team and All-Tournament Team honors.

Minnesota
For his junior season, Robbins transferred to Minnesota. He was granted immediate eligibility by the National Collegiate Athletic Association. Robbins helped replace Daniel Oturu, who left for a professional career. On January 3, 2021, he recorded 27 points, 14 rebounds and five blocks in a 77–60 win over Ohio State. Robbins was subsequently named Big Ten Player of the Week and Oscar Robertson National Player of the Week. He missed the final six games of the season with a sprained ankle. As a junior, he averaged 11.7 points, 6.6 rebounds and a Big Ten-leading 2.7 blocks per game.

Vanderbilt
Robbins transferred to Vanderbilt for his senior season. He missed the first several months of the season and averaged 6.8 points, 4.0 rebounds and 2.0 blocks per game. He came back for his fifth season of eligibility and averaged 15 points, 6.8 rebounds, and 3.2 blocks per game. On March 2, 2023, Robbins suffered a leg injury early in a game against Kentucky, forcing him to miss the rest of the season. Despite this injury, Robbins was named the 2022-23 SEC Defensive Player of the Year.

Career statistics

College

|-
| style="text-align:left;"| 2018–19
| style="text-align:left;"| Drake
| 31 || 2 || 11.3 || .442 || .231 || .595 || 2.7 || .5 || .3 || 1.1 || 4.1
|-
| style="text-align:left;"| 2019–20
| style="text-align:left;"| Drake
| 34 || 34 || 27.1 || .499 || .244 || .694 || 7.1 || .8 || .6 || 2.9 || 14.1
|-
| style="text-align:left;"| 2020–21
| style="text-align:left;"| Minnesota
| 23 || 23 || 24.7 || .441 || .327 || .694 || 6.6 || 1.1 || .7 || 2.7 || 11.7
|- class="sortbottom"
| style="text-align:center;" colspan="2"| Career
| 88 || 59 || 20.9 || .473 || .283 || .680 || 5.4 || .8 || .5 || 2.2 || 10.0

Personal life
Robbins' uncle, Ed Conroy, is head basketball coach at the Citadel in South Carolina. He was previously an assistant basketball coach for Vanderbilt and an assistant coach at Minnesota when he recruited Robbins to transfer from Drake to Minnesota. When Conroy left for Vanderbilt, Robbins followed his uncle there. His cousin and Conroy's son, Hunt, played basketball for Minnesota as a point guard.

References

External links
Vanderbilt Commodores bio
Minnesota Golden Gophers bio
Drake Bulldogs bio

1999 births
Living people
American men's basketball players
Basketball players from Iowa
Centers (basketball)
Drake Bulldogs men's basketball players
Minnesota Golden Gophers men's basketball players
Sportspeople from Davenport, Iowa